Club Baloncesto Aismalíbar was a Spanish basketball club based in Montcada.

History
The origins of the basketball team goes back to the year 1947  when the company Aismalíbar created a social club for its workers. The employees created a basketball team that was entered in the Trade Union Work of Education and Leisure League. After several successes in that competition, the company entered a team in the Catalan Basketball Federation under the name CB Aismalíbar. This was champion of Second and First Regional Catalan on.

The Aismalíbar company then made a strong economic investment to make a great team in the 1950s, partly as an advertising medium for business and partly for the great love of basketball grew in the city, hired as a player-coach Eduardo Kucharski, and players of the category of Emiliano Rodriguez, who later would make history at Real Madrid, Francesc Nino Buscató, and center Francisco Borrell, the first player in more than two meters in the history of Spanish basketball.

The Aismalíbar Moncada was champion of Catalonia but failed to win any major national title, but came close to it. He was runner-up four times Generalissimo Cup: 1956, 1957, 1959 and 1964 .

In the 1956-1957 season Aismalíbar became one of the six founding teams in the league.

One of the most talked wins Aismalíbar took place in 1957 when, in a tournament in Sicily (Italy), defeated Sparta Prague 77-73, becoming the first team from Western Europe defeating one of the communist bloc .

The decline of the club began when the team had to play their games at the Palacio de los Deportes of Barcelona, and not on its track Montcada, because the new rules forced to dispute parties in indoor arenas, and the company Aismalíbar he could not afford the costs involved cover track of your social club. The club was forced to pass on to their best players and in the end, finally disappeared at the end of the 1963-1964 season.

In 1979 was founded in Moncada and Reixach (Barcelona) a new basketball club, the Club Bàsquet Montcada, who tried to fill the void left by the Aismalíbar in the city, although it has never reached the elite of the Spanish basketball ... yes it belonged for a decade Aismalíbar.

Honours & achievements
Spanish Cup
 Runners-up (4): 1956, 1957, 1959, 1964
Campionat de Catalunya
 Winners (1): 1956
 Runners-up (1): 1957

References

Basketball teams established in 1947
1947 establishments in Spain